This is the list of United Kingdom MPs by seniority, 2017–2019. The Members of Parliament (MPs) are ranked by the beginning of their terms in office, in the House of Commons.

The House of Commons of the 57th Parliament of the United Kingdom was elected on 8 June 2017, first met on 13 June 2017 and dissolved on 6 November 2019. The constituencies and party affiliations listed reflect those during the 57th Parliament. Seats and party affiliations for other Parliaments will be different for certain members.

This article describes the criteria for seniority in the House of Commons, as set out in Father of the House: a House of Commons background paper.

Seniority criteria
The criteria for seniority, used in this article, are derived from the way that the Father of the House is selected. They are not laid down in Standing Orders but arise from the customary practice of the House of Commons.

The modern custom is that the Father of the House is the MP who has the longest continuous service. If two or more members were first elected in the same General Election (or at by-elections held on the same day), then priority is given to the one who was sworn in first. The order of swearing in is recorded in Hansard, the official record of proceedings.

When a member has had broken service, that does not affect his or her seniority (for the purpose of qualifying as the Father of the House) which is based on the latest period of continuous service.

The Sinn Féin members, who abstain from taking their seats at Westminster, have never been sworn in. They are ranked (in this list) after all other members who have taken their seats. Between themselves they are ranked by the first date of election, for the current period of continuous service. If they are equal on that criterion, then they are ranked in alphabetical order by surname.

In the House of Commons, the sole mandatory duty of the Father of the House is to preside over the election of a new Speaker whenever that office becomes vacant. The relevant Standing Order does not refer to this member by the title "Father of the House", referring instead to the longest-serving member of the House present who is not a Minister of the Crown (meaning that if the Father is absent or a government minister, the next person in line presides).

Summary of Members elected by party
The following was the composition of the Commons at dissolution at 00:01, Wednesday 6 November 2019, when all 650 seats became vacant pending the 2019 United Kingdom general election.

Notes
For full details of changes during the 57th Parliament, see Defections and suspensions and By-elections.
Labour, as the largest party not in government, took the role of Official Opposition (OO). The Co-operative Party was represented in the House of Commons by Labour MPs sitting with the Labour and Co-operative designation.
"Members elected" refers to the composition resulting from the election on 8 June 2017, but note that the confidence and supply arrangement (C&S) was only reached on 26 June.
The "voting total" is the effective size of the House excluding vacancies, suspensions, and certain members (ten at dissolution): the Speaker, two (usually three) Deputy Speakers (one Labour and one Conservative) who have only a tie-breaking vote constrained by conventions, and seven abstentionist members (Sinn Féin). This left relevant party voting totals as follows: Con 297, Lab 241, SF 0, Speaker 0.
The "safe majority" (the number of seats needed to have a majority of one or two), "Gov short by" (the margin by which the governing Conservatives are short of that majority), and "Gov + C&S total" are based on the voting totals. The Conservative government entered into a confidence and supply agreement with the Democratic Unionist Party (DUP) to secure a small majority, which shrank due to defections, finally disappearing on 3 September 2019. Hence, the "Gov + C&S majority", calculated as the sum of voting Conservative and DUP members, less the sum of all other voting members, ended up negative.

List of members of Parliament by seniority
This article assigns a numerical rank to each of the 650 members initially elected to the 57th Parliament. Other members, who were not the first person declared elected to a seat but who joined the House during the Parliament, are not assigned a number.
Members named in italics are no longer sitting.

See also
List of MPs elected in the 2017 United Kingdom general election
List of United Kingdom by-elections (2010–present)
List of United Kingdom MPs by seniority

References

External links
 Father of the House: House of Commons background paper Retrieved 19 May 2015 
 Members 1979–2010 Retrieved 16 March 2015

2017 United Kingdom general election
2017
Seniority